Lonicera ligustrina (女贞叶忍冬, nü zhen ye ren dong) is a species of honeysuckle found in Bhutan, India, Nepal, and China. It grows as an evergreen, semi-evergreen, or deciduous shrub approximately 1.5-2.5 meters in height, with leathery or paper-like leaves 0.4-8 × 0.2-1.5 cm in size.

Infraspecific taxa
 Lonicera ligustrina var. yunnanensis  The cultivar 'Baggesen's Gold' has received the Royal Horticultural Society's Award of Garden Merit.

Synonyms
 Lonicera buxifolia H. Lév.
 Lonicera ligustrina var. ligustrina
 Lonicera ligustrina subsp. ligustrina
 Lonicera missionis H. Lév.
 Lonicera virgultorum W.W. Sm.
 Lonicera wightianum Wall.
 Xylosteon ligustrinum (Wall.) D. Don

References

 Wallich in Roxburgh, Fl. Ind. 2: 179. 1824.
 Encyclopedia of Life entry

ligustrina
Flora of the Indian subcontinent
Flora of China